Scheduler is a person responsible for making a particular schedule.

Scheduler could also refer to:

 Scheduler (computing)
 Network scheduler, program that manages network queues for transmitting and receiving packets
 Job scheduler, a class of software for controlling unattended background program execution
 Job shop scheduling, the algorithmic problem of assigning jobs to processors in order to minimize the total makespan
 I/O scheduler, software deciding the order of block I/O operations will be submitted to storage volumes
 Process scheduler, a part of operating system's kernel

See also
 Scheduling software